The Rampur Raza Library (Rāmpur Razā Kitāb Khāna) located in Rampur, Uttar Pradesh, India is a repository of Indo-Islamic cultural heritage and a treasure-house of knowledge established in the last decades of the 18th century. It was built up by successive Nawabs of Rampur and is now managed by the Government of India on the name of Raza Ali Khan of Rampur.

It contains very rare and valuable collection of manuscripts, historical documents, specimens of Islamic calligraphy, miniature paintings, astronomical instruments and rare illustrated works in Arabic and Persian. Rampur's Raza Library also contains printed works in Sanskrit, Hindi, Urdu, Pashto (having the original manuscript of the first translation of the Qur'an in addition to other important books/documents), Tamil and Turkish, and approximately 30,000 printed books (including periodicals) in various other languages. It is one of Asia's largest libraries.

History
Nawab Faizullah Khan, who ruled Rampur from 1774 to 1794, established the library from his personal collection of ancient manuscripts and miniature specimens of Islamic calligraphy in the last decades of the 18th century. It is one of the biggest library in Asia. As all the succeeding Nawabs were the great patrons of scholars, poets, painters, calligraphers and musicians, and thus, the library grew by leaps and bounds and notable additions were made to the collection during the rule of Nawab Ahmad Ali Khan (1794–1840).

Nawab Muhammad Said Khan (1840–1855) created a separate department for the library and shifted the collection to new rooms. He engaged Agha Yusuf Ali Maulavi, an Afghan Scholar, to organize the collection into a Library. The Nawab invited well known calligraphers, illuminators and binders from Kashmir and other parts of India. The Nawab also got a seal with the following Persian inscription: "Hast in muhr bar Kutub Khana : Waali-i-Rampur farzana." It means "This is the seal of the Library : by the wise ruler (Nawab) of Rampur."

Nawab Yousuf Ali Khan Nazim succeeded his father and was crowned on 1 April 1855. The Nawab was himself a poet of Urdu and took guidance from the celebrated poet Mirza Ghalib. The Nawab's Diwan (collection of verses) written in gold is preserved in the Library. After the first struggle of India's freedom during the Sepoy Mutiny of 1857, a large number of eminent poets, writers and scholars settled in Rampur.

Nawab Kalb Ali Khan (1865–1887) evinced keen interest in the collection of rare manuscripts, paintings and specimens of Islamic calligraphy. He was himself an eminent scholar and poet. He commissioned scholars to secure rare manuscripts, paintings and art pieces of the Mughal and Awadh Libraries. The Nawab also performed a Hajj pilgrimage and brought a good number of rare manuscripts, including the unique parchment manuscript of Quran attributed to Ali (d 661) of the 7th century AD.

Nawab Mushtaq Ali Khan(1887–1889) was permanently sick. General Azamuddin Khan was appointed the Regent to look after the affairs of the State in 1887. He constituted a managing committee and allotted a budget for the upkeep and development of the library. A new building was also constructed where the Library collection was shifted from Tosha Khana in 1892. He also extended facilities to senior academicians and research scholars from other parts of the country.

Nawab Hamid Ali Khan (1889–1930) visited several countries before ascending to the throne. He was highly educated and a prolific builder and built impressive palaces, castle ramparts, and state building in Rampur city. He also built a splendid mansion of Indo-European style named Hamid Manzil inside the fort in 1904. The Raza Library was later shifted to this magnificent building in 1957. Nawab Hamid Ali Khan added new items to the valuable collection and enforced certain reforms in the management of the library. During his time, Hakim Ajmal Khan, Maulana Najmul Ghani Khan and Hafiz Ahmad Ali Khan 'Shauq' managed the Library.

Raza Ali Khan of Rampur ascended the throne on 21 June 1930. He had his education in India and abroad. He showed a very progressive bent from his early age and introduced modern education in schools and colleges. He also invited educationists of repute to organize these academic institutions. Besides he was a great lover of Indian music for which he purchased several rare manuscripts and books on the subject.

Current status
After Rampur State joined the Union of India, in 1949 the Library was controlled by the management of a Trust which was created on 6 August 1951. The Trust management continued until July 1975.

Prof. S. Nurul Hasan, Minister for Education, Social Welfare and Culture of the Govt. of India, came repeatedly to the Library and took a serious view of the neglected condition of this precious heritage. At his instance suitable measures were taken for providing better management and sufficient financial grants. As a result, the Government of India took over the Library on 1 July 1975 under an Act of Parliament and assumed the full funding and management of the Library. When the library was taken over by the Central Government, Nawab Syed Murtaza Ali Khan was nominated the Vice-Chairman of the newly created Board for life under sub-section 5 (1) of the Act. With his sad demise on 8 February 1982, the post of Vice-Chairman was automatically abolished. Now the Library occupies the position of an autonomous institution of national importance under Department of Culture, Government of India and is fully funded by Central Government.

Dr. Waqarul Hasan Siddiqi who took over as Officer On Special Duty of Rampur Raza Library on 16 August 1993, is a distinguished archaeologist, art historian, epigraphist and numismatist of India. Retired from the post of Director, Expedition Abroad, Archaeological Survey of India, he had explored and excavated scores of historical sites including Kalibangan, Purana Qila, Dak Patthar, Rishikesh, Champaner, Karwan, Fatehpur Sikri etc. Besides he was responsible for the scientific conservation of dozens of National monuments including the famous Angkor Wat temple in Cambodia which project he monitored for six years. He participated in many International symposia in more than fifteen countries and was elected Vice-President of Silk Route Project of UNESCO at Alma-Ata in Kazakhstan in 1985.

His long tenure as Officer On Special Duty in Rampur Raza Library has reorganized this unique repository of rare manuscripts, paintings and art objects. The Library has now attained an International status of higher studies. He has a long list of more than 50 books and journals published so far to his credit. He has been amply rewarded prestigious awards for his excellent achievements and unparalleled services during this period. It is also a designated 'Manuscript Conservation Centre' (MCC) under the National Mission for Manuscripts established in 2003.

References

External links

 Raza Library, Official website

Libraries in Uttar Pradesh
Architecture in India
Rampur, Uttar Pradesh
18th-century establishments in India
Archives in India
Islam in India
Government buildings in Uttar Pradesh
Libraries established in the 1790s